Ammar Awad (born 1st of August 1968) is a former Syrian footballer who played for Syria national football team.

External links
worldfootball.net
11v11.com

1968 births
Syrian footballers
Living people
Syria international footballers
People from Latakia
Hutteen Latakia players
SC Toulon players
Association football defenders
Syrian Premier League players